Chris Hyde (born 9 August 1982) is a former Australian rules football player for the Richmond Football Club. 

He retired as an AFL player in 2008 after playing 93 games, and now works for the NSW Game Council as the Game Manager for the Snowy/South East region.

He continues to play football for the Albury Football Club Tigers in the Ovens & Murray Football League.

Hyde has played in ten consecutive O&MFNL senior football grand finals with Albury in - 2009, 2010, 2011, 2012, 2013, 2014, 2015, 2016, 2017 & 2018 O&MFL premierships (bold print - premierships years).

Hyde won the 2017 O&MFL Best & Fairest, the Morris Medal.

External links

Australian rules footballers from New South Wales
Richmond Football Club players
Living people
1982 births
Murray Bushrangers players
Albury Football Club players